Bolbocoleon is a genus of green algae, in the family Bolbocoleonaceae.

References

Ulvophyceae genera
Ulvales